Linwood, United Kingdom may refer to:
 Linwood, Hampshire, England
 Linwood, Lincolnshire, England
 Linwood, Renfrewshire, Scotland